Sevindi is a village in the Oğuzeli District, Gaziantep Province, Turkey. The village is inhabited by Abdals of the Kurular tribe.

References

Villages in Oğuzeli District